"Thank God for the Radio" is a 1984 single by The Kendalls.  "Thank God for the Radio" was The Kendalls' third and last number one country hit.  The single went to number one for one week and spent a total of twelve weeks on the country chart.

Cover versions
The song was covered by Alan Jackson in 1994 for his album, Who I Am

Charts

Weekly charts

Year-end charts

References
 

1984 singles
The Kendalls songs
Songs written by Max D. Barnes
Alan Jackson songs
1984 songs
Mercury Records singles
Songs about radio